No. 453 Squadron is an air traffic control unit of the Royal Australian Air Force. It was established at Bankstown, New South Wales, in 1941 as a fighter squadron, in accordance with Article XV of the Empire Air Training Scheme for overseas service with the Royal Air Force during World War II. No. 453 Squadron saw combat first in the Malayan and Singapore campaigns of 1941–42. Severe aircraft losses effectively destroyed the squadron and it was disbanded in March 1942.  A successor unit by the same name was raised in Britain from mid-1942, to take part in fighting against Nazi Germany in Europe until 1945. The squadron was disbanded in 1946. It was re-formed in its current role in 2011.

History

World War II

Malaya and Singapore

No. 453 Squadron was raised as an Article XV squadron under the terms of the Empire Air Training Scheme, at Bankstown, New South Wales, on 23 May 1941. It was deployed to Singapore in August 1941, as fears of war with Japan increased. No. 453 Squadron, along with No. 21 Squadron RAAF, No. 243 Squadron RAF and No. 488 Squadron RNZAF, converted to Brewster F2A Buffalo fighters, which proved to be poorly built, unreliable and unpopular with the pilots. The squadron was initially deployed to Sembawang.

When the Japanese invasion of Malaya began on 8 December (7 December in the Western Hemisphere, coinciding with the attack on Pearl Harbor), the commanding officer of No. 453 Squadron, Squadron Leader William Harper was visiting Australia. A British officer, Flight Lieutenant Tim Vigors of No. 243 Squadron RAF, was attached to No. 453 Squadron as acting commanding officer.

The squadron was ordered to provide air cover for the two British battleships making up Admiral Tom Phillips' Force Z: Repulse and Prince of Wales. However, Phillips' actions, including a resistance to liaise with the Allied air forces, exposed the battleships to a Japanese air attack that occurred on 10 December. The acting commanding officer of No. 453 Squadron was not notified of the location of Force Z until an hour after the Japanese attack had begun. Repulse and Prince of Wales were both sunk. Three days later, the squadron's 16 aircraft were ordered to move to Ipoh; during the move, three aircraft were lost as a result of accidents. On arrival, the squadron was "scrambled" to defend the airfield against a Japanese bomber attack and in the ensuing dogfight, five Japanese aircraft were destroyed. The following day, the squadron was again scrambled to defend its airbase against a large formation of 40 Japanese fighters; three Japanese aircraft were shot down for the loss of one aircraft in the air, and several on the ground. After this, No. 453 Squadron moved to Kuala Lumpur where they received a batch of replacement aircraft.

No. 453 Squadron strove to support Allied ground troops in Malaya by providing air cover and attacking Japanese troops and transport, but the outnumbered Allied squadrons suffered high losses in the air and on the ground. The heaviest losses came on 22 December when five Buffalos were destroyed and another four damaged, with three pilots being killed. On 24 December, with only three working aircraft remaining, No. 453 Squadron withdrew to Singapore and merged with 21 Squadron, which was brought up to strength with an allocation of replacement aircraft. The amalgamated unit continued to fight on, until late January when they were separated again. No. 21 Squadron was then sent to the Netherlands East Indies, while No. 453 continued to operate the remaining six Buffaloes. In early February, only four aircraft remained operational and they were flown to Java while the squadron's ground crew were evacuated by ship. When No. 453 Squadron arrived in Java it could not be brought up to operational readiness again due to lack of serviceable aircraft. It was ordered back to Australia, and was officially disbanded at Adelaide on 15 March 1942. In spite of many technical problems, and being outmatched by the Japanese Zero, the Buffalo squadrons claimed a 2:1 kill ratio against Japanese aircraft in 1941–42.

Europe

The squadron was reformed from Australian personnel in the United Kingdom at RAF Drem, near Edinburgh, in Scotland on 18 June 1942. The squadron was equipped with Supermarine Spitfire aircraft, and joined RAF Fighter Command. The squadron provided defensive air patrols over Britain and surrounding waters, escorted Allied bombers over Europe, and conducted offensive strikes in its own right attacking targets on both land and sea.  Its first engagement with German aircraft came on 31 October 1942, after it had moved to Hornchurch; during this action the squadron accounted for three German fighters and one bomber, and lost one of its own aircraft. At the end of the year, the squadron relocated to Southend and continued operations from there until mid-1943 when it moved to Ibsley, remaining there until August when it moved once again to Perranporth. While operating from there, on 8 October, the squadron engaged a formation of eight German Messerschmitt Bf 110 fighter-bombers, during which five German aircraft were shot down and two Spitfires were destroyed.

In January 1944, the squadron joined the Allies Second Tactical Air Force, attached to No. 125 Wing RAF (part of No. 83 Group RAF). Further moves occurred over subsequent months, as the squadron began to focus on ground attack sorties, in the lead up to the Allied invasion of North West Europe. Soon after D-Day, the squadron moved to France, where it operated from the hastily constructed landing ground B11 at Longues-sur-Mer, close to the front line. On 16 June, a large-scale dogfight was fought with 12 Messerschmitt Bf 109s over Caen, during which several were shot down. As the Allies advanced, the squadron moved forward so that it could continue to provide close support to the ground troops. This continued until September 1944 when the squadron was withdrawn back to the United Kingdom. From November 1944 to March 1945, No. 453 Squadron was heavily engaged in striking at assembly and launch sites used by the Germans in their V-1 and V-2 rocket attacks against Britain.

On 2 May 1945, the squadron escorted the aircraft that returned Queen Wilhelmina to The Netherlands after three years in exile. This was No. 453 Squadron's last mission of the war; it moved between several bases in Britain in the months immediately following the end of hostilities before deploying to Germany in September. After the war it was planned that the squadron would form a long-term Australian presence among the occupation forces but sufficient volunteers could not be found to make this a viable proposition. Thus, on 21 January 1946 the squadron disbanded. During the war the squadron suffered 29 fatalities, all but one of them Australian.

Since 2011
No. 453 Squadron was re-raised, as an air traffic control unit, on 16 February 2011. It forms part of No. 44 Wing and is headquartered at RAAF Base Williamtown, New South Wales. The squadron maintains subordinate flights at Williamtown, RAAF Base Richmond, RAAF Base East Sale, RAAF Base Edinburgh, RAAF Base Pearce and the Royal Australian Navy air base HMAS Albatross, providing air traffic control for these bases.

Aircraft operated

No. 453 Squadron operated the following aircraft:

Commanding officers

No. 453 Squadron was commanded by the following officers:

Notes

References

Further reading

External links

 Sqn Ldr R.H.S. Ewins 453 Sqn Spitfire pilot
 Australian War Memorial: 453 Squadron
 RAAF Museum Point Cook: 453 Squadron
 453 Squadron – A Brief History

453 Squadron
Military units and formations established in 1941
Australian Article XV squadrons of World War II
1941 establishments in Australia
Military Units in Western Australia